"Take It EZ" is the debut single by Chicago rapper Common from his debut album Can I Borrow a Dollar?. It is produced by 2 pc. DRK, a production team made up of Immenslope and The Twilite Tone. The song's beat mixes keyboards and saxophone playing by Lenny Underwood and Tony Orbach respectively, as well as a sample from "When Will the Day Come" by Rasa. Its beat anticipates the soulful production from Common's second album, Resurrection. It reached #5 on the Hot Rap Singles chart making it the most popular single from Common's debut album. Stanton Swihart of Allmusic considers it to be a standout track on the album.

Track listing

A-side
 "Take It EZ" (4:08)
 "Take It EZ (Instrumental)" (4:08)

B-side
 "Take It EZ (Jazz Instrumental)" (4:08)
 "Soul by the Pound" (4:20)

Chart positions

References

See also
List of Common songs

1992 debut singles
Common (rapper) songs
1992 songs
Relativity Records singles
Songs written by Common (rapper)
Songs written by No I.D.